Sebastian Meijer (born September 1, 1984) is a Swedish professional ice hockey player. Meijer represented the Swedish junior national team at the 2004 World Junior Ice Hockey Championships. His brother is singer Lukas Meijer.

References

External links

Living people
HV71 players
Leksands IF players
Luleå HF players
VIK Västerås HK players
1984 births
Swedish ice hockey forwards